Rangers FC is a famous Solomon Islands football club, playing in the Honiara FA League and in the Solomon Islands National Club Championship.

Rangers FC won the Honiara FA League 8 times in: 1985, 1988, 1991, 1995, 1996, 1997, 1998 and 1999. The club has played once in the OFC Champions League, in the 1987.

Titles
Solomon Islands National Club Championship: (0)
Honiara FA League: (8)
1985, 1988, 1991, 1995, 1996, 1997, 1998, 1999. 
Solomon Islands Cup: (0)

Performance in OFC competitions
OFC Champions League: 1 appearances 
Best: Fourth place
1987: Fourth place

Current squad

coach: Mohamad Mayelikohan

References

Football clubs in the Solomon Islands
Honiara